Texas Tech University College of Architecture is the college of architecture at Texas Tech University in Lubbock, Texas. The architecture program has existed at Texas Tech University since 1927. Texas Tech's Master of Architecture is a professional degree and it is accredited by the National Architectural Accrediting Board (NAAB). On November 30, 2022, the school announced it would be named the Huckabee College of Architecture.

History 
Texas Tech University first offered architecture education in 1927 within the College of Engineering. The emphasis of the program was advanced construction and mechanical equipment of buildings. Four years later the architecture program transformed into the Department of Architecture and Allied Arts and it emphasis expanded from engineering and structures to design. In 1933, the department offered its first Bachelor of Architecture degree, a program that the next year would be expanded to a five-year degree. By 1957 the program was accredited with the National Architectural Accrediting Board, and has been continuously accredited since then.

In 1971 the department moved to its current building and in 1975 the board of regents designated the architecture program as the Division of Architecture. Eleven years later, the division of architecture would become an independent college. The State Coordinating Board first approved the program's Master of Architecture degree in 1985, and in 1992 the Master of Architecture professional degree program was awarded a full five-year accreditation. The College of Architecture became the first architecture education program to offer a 173 credit hour Master of Architecture professional degree in 1996.

Currently, Texas Tech College of Architecture offers a  Bachelor of Science in Architecture (B.S. Arch) consists of 124 credit hours of undergraduate courses. The M.Arch program is a 4 + 2-year program (60 hours of graduate coursework). This is a professional degree and graduates can sit for their licensing exam (ARE).

Notable people

Former students

Faculty

Lecture Series 
"The Texas Tech College of Architecture Lecture Series aims to create and explore a discourse on topics ranging from the built environment, creative and innovative scholarship, to current issues taking place in our society. The series features lectures from architects, theorists, scholars, and educators exploring, expanding, and uncovering new ground for the discipline of Architecture. TTU CoA Lectures Series is supported by the Dean's Funds for Excellence."

2021-2022 
Lubbock Lecturers
 Kuo Pao Lian and Pavlina Ilieva, co-founders of PI.KL
 Dawn Finley, founding principal of Interloop—Architecture, Professor of Architecture and the Director of Graduate Studies at Rice University School of Architecture
 Gary Cunningham, founder and president of Cunningham Architects
 Neeraj Bhatia, founder of The Open Workshop
 Charles L. Davis II, Associate Professor of Architectural History and Criticism at the University at Buffalo
 Viola Ago, director MIRACLES Architecture, School of Architecture and Urban Design at UCLA
 Chris Cornelius, founding principal of studio:indigenous and Chair of the Department of Architecture at the University of New Mexico 
 Ted Flato, Founding Partner at Lake|Flato Architects
El Paso Lecturers
 Paola Aguirre, founder of Borderless
 Jorge Ambrosi and Gabriela Etchegaray, founders AMBROSI | ETCHEGARAY, Adjunct Professors at GSAPP, Columbia University
 Anna Puigjaner, co-founder MAIO, Associate Professor of Professional Practice at Columbia GSAPP
 Alvin Huang, founder, SDA | Synthesis Design + Architecture, Director and Associate Professor at USC Architecture
 Dana Cupkova, co-Founder & design director, EPIPHYTE Lab, Associate Professor at Carnegie Mellon University

2020-2021 

 Germane Barnes, Assistant Professor and the Director of The Community, Housing & Identity Lab at the University of Miami
 Shawhin Roudbari, Assistant Professor Environmental Design, University of Colorado Boulder; Member of Dissent by Design 
 Sekou Cooke, Assistant Professor of Architecture, Syracuse University
 Alice Tseng, Department Chair and Professor of History of Art and Architecture at Boston University
 Lydia Kallipoliti, Assistant Professor at the Cooper Union
 Fernanda Canales, founder Fernanda Canales Arquitectura
 Kathryn Dean, founder, Dean/Wolf Architects
 V. Mitch McEwen, founding principal at Atelier Office, Assistant Professor of Architecture, Princeton University
 Molly Wright Steenson, Senior Associate Dean for Research in the College of Fine Arts & Associate Professor, School of Design, Carnegie Mellon University  
 Esra Akcan, Michael McCarthy Professor in the Department of Architecture,Director of IES at the Einaudi Center for International Studies at Cornell University.
 Billie Tsien, co-founder Tod Williams Billie Tsien Architects,Charles Gwathmey Professor in Practice, Yale Architecture
 Hsinming Fung, principal and co-founder, Hodgetts + Fung, Professor, Sci_Arc Design Studio

2019-2020 
Lubbock Lecturers

 Dora Epstein Jones, Texas Tech University College of Architecture
 José Aragüez, Columbia GSAPP
 Maria Hurtado de Mendoza Wahrolen, co-founder of estudio_entresitio, Associate Professor of Architecture, NJIT
 Thom Mayne, founding partner, Morphosis
 Leslie Lok & Sassa Sisvkoic, co founders at HANNAH, Assistant Professors, Cornell University
 Andrew Zago, principal at Zago Architecture, Clinical Professor at the University of Illinois at Chicago
 Noémie Despland-Lichtert and Brendan Shea, co-founders Roundhouse Platform
 Neil Spiller, founding Director of the AVATAR (Advanced Virtual and Technological Architectural Research) Group, Editor of AD
 Jeffrey S. Nesbit, founding director of the research group Grounding Design

El Paso Lecturers

 Errol Barron, founding partner of Errol Barron/Michael Toups Architects, Professor of Architecture at Tulane University
 Tatiana Bilbao, founder and principal, Tatiana Bilbao Estudio
 Ila Berman, Elwood R. Quesada Professor in Architecture, University of Virginia

2018-2019 
Lubbock Lecturers

 Chip Lord
 Neyran Turan, partner at NEMESTUDIO and Assistant Professor of Architecture at the UC-Berkeley
 Alejandro Zaera-Polo, principal at AZPML
 Jonathan Solomon, Director of Architecture, Interior Architecture & Designed Objects School of the Art Institute of Chicago
 Gabriela Carrillo, principal at TALLER
 Cade Hayes & Jesus Robles, Jr., founders of DUST

El Paso Lecturers

 Kathryn Dean, founder, Dean/Wolf Architects
 Andrés Jaque, Associate Professor of Professional Practice at Columbia GSAPP
 Felipe Correa, Vincent and Eleanor Shea Professor and Chair of the Department of Architecture at the University of Virginia
 Sarah Whiting, founder of WW, Dean of Rice University School of Architecture
 Luis Carranza, Professor at Roger Williams University
 René Davids, Davids Killory Architecture, Professor of Architecture and Urban Design at UC Berkeley

2017-2018 
Lubbock Lecturers

 Marlon Blackwell
 Jose Castillo, founder and principal of A|911
 Carlos Jiménez, Carlos Jiménez Studio
 Merrill Elam, principal of Mack Scogin Merril Elam Architects
 Hillary Sample & Michael Meredith, principals MOS Architects
 Keller Easterling, Enid Storm Dwyer Professor and Director of the MED Program at Yale University
 Preston Scott Cohen
 Meredith Miller and Ellie Abrons
 Sharon Johnston, Johnston Marklee & Associates
 Cristiane Muniz, Una Arquitetos
 Neeraj Bhatia

El Paso Lecturers

 Frida Escobedo
 Alvaro Rodriguez
 Ronald Rael & Virginia San Fratello

References

External links
 

Architecture schools in Texas
Educational institutions established in 1927
Architecture
1927 establishments in Texas